Rastko Cvetković (born 22 June 1970) is a Serbian former professional basketball player. He is a son of the famous Serbian basketball player Vladimir Cvetković.

Playing career 
A center, Cvetković played professionally 14 seasons, from 1978 to 2002. During his playing days, he played for Crvena zvezda, AEK Athens, Denver Nuggets, Soproni, Espoon Honka, Belenenses, and Seixal. In 1993, he won a YUBA League championship with Crvena zvezda. In the 1995–96 NBA season, Cvetković played for the Denver Nuggets, recording 0.7 points and 0.8 rebounds per game. He retired as a player with Seixal in 2002.

National team career 
In August 1987, Cvetković was a member of the Yugoslavian Cadets that won the gold medal at the European Championship for Cadets in Hungary. Over five tournament games, he averaged 4.8 points per game. In August 1988, Cvetković was a member of the Yugoslavia junior team that won the gold medal at the European Championship for Juniors in Yugoslavia. Over five tournament games, he averaged 3.2 points per game.

NBA career statistics

Regular season 

|-
| align="left" | 1995–96
| align="left" | Denver
| 14 || 0 || 3.4 || .313 || .000 || .000 || .8 || .2 || .1 || .1 || .7
|}

See also
 List of father-and-son combinations who have played for Crvena zvezda
 List of KK Crvena zvezda players with 100 games played
 List of Serbian NBA players

References

External links
Rastko Cvetković at basketball-reference.com

1970 births
Living people
AEK B.C. players
Centers (basketball)
Denver Nuggets players
KK Crvena zvezda players
National Basketball Association players from Serbia
Serbian expatriate basketball people in Finland
Serbian expatriate basketball people in Greece
Serbian expatriate basketball people in Hungary
Serbian expatriate basketball people in Portugal
Serbian expatriate basketball people in the United States
Serbian men's basketball players
Soproni KC players
Undrafted National Basketball Association players